Mark Pellizzer (born June 14, 1980), better known by his stage name Mark Pelli, is a Canadian musician, singer, songwriter and record producer. He is best known for being a guitarist and vocalist for the pop-reggae group Magic!. In addition to performing Mark has produced and written songs for several artists including: Chris Brown, Trey Songz, Shakira, Anthony Hamilton, Classified and Vita Chambers. Pelli currently resides in Los Angeles, California.

Early life 
Mark Pellizzer was born in Toronto, Ontario, Canada on June 14, 1980. He began piano at age six and the guitar at thirteen years old As a child, he traveled throughout Toronto to perform in different venues offering a diverse range of genres. At age sixteen, Pelli began producing and engineering albums and working at various recording studios. He studied classical piano at York University, where he had the opportunity to study under the virtuoso pianist Antonin Kubalek. He transferred to the University of Toronto where he switched to study jazz guitar under the mentorship of David Occhipinti. He graduated in 2004. From 2007 to 2012, Pellizzer was a member of the Justin Nozuka band, where he assisted in composing music and touring

Solo career 
Pelli released two singles titled "You Changed Me" and "Lifetime" which are available for streaming on Spotify.

Collaborations with other artists 
Pelli has collaborated with a number of well-known artists. In 2012, he worked with The Messengers to produce the song "Don't Judge Me" for Chris Brown which hit #1 on U.S. Urban chart, #18 on the Hot R&B/Hip-Hop Songs chart and 67 on the Billboard Top 100 chart.  Pelli co-produced/wrote the song Cut Me Deep for Shakira.  He co-wrote the song Inner Ninja for the Canadian rapper Classified which hit number 5 in Canada and was 5× Platinum.  Pelli co-produced/wrote the song Serial Killer for Trey Songz.  He co wrote/produced and mixed the song Coming Home for Anthony Hamilton.  He co-produced/wrote the song Fix You for Vita Chambers. Pelli has also worked in the studio with Usher, Jennifer Lopez, JoJo and Marsha Ambrosius. In 2014, he collaborated with Kiprich to produce and feature on the song "My Own Holiday"  In August 2015, he announced a collaboration with artist Major Myjah, to produce the song "Disposable" off Major Myjah's new EP titled "Trouble." Most recently Pelli co-wrote, produced and mixed most of Sabrina Claudio's debut EP titled:  "Confidently Lost" including:  "Too Much Too Late",  "I Won't", "Tell Me", "Runnin' Thru Lovers", "Confidently Lost", and the acoustic version of "Tell Me." In 2018, Pelli worked with T-Minus to produce J.Cole's song titled "Kevin's Heart."

Magic! 
Mark Pelli is the guitarist, keyboardist and vocalist for the pop-reggae group Magic!.  Pelli started the group with frontman Nasri Atweh due to their friendship and unique musical connection in the studio. Magic! is a fusion of several different musical styles but is primarily considered a pop-reggae group with a sonic aesthetic similar to The Police. In 2013, the group released the song "Rude", which ranked #1 at the Billboard Top 100 chart. The group toured with Maroon 5, and in 2015, and are touring in Europe for summer 2015. The group won an American Music Award in 2014 for "Rude" as the Best Single of the Year In 2015, they received a Juno Award for Breakthrough Group of The Year.

Awards and acclaim 
In 2014, Pelli received the Socan Award for his song "Inner Ninja" as a collaboration effort with Classified Pelli is the recipient of two Juno Awards for Single of the Year and Breakthrough Group of the Year

References

8. http://canadianmusician.com/blog/2015/07/06/a-conversation-with-mark-pelli-pellizzer/#more-3365

Living people
1980 births
Musicians from Toronto
University of Toronto alumni
21st-century Canadian guitarists